The 1924 Missouri gubernatorial election was held on November 4, 1924 and resulted in a narrow victory for the Republican nominee, former Missouri Superintendent of Schools Sam Aaron Baker, over the Democratic candidate, Arthur W. Nelson, Socialist candidate William M. Brandt, and Socialist Labor nominee William Wesley Cox. Baker had defeated lieutenant governor Hiram Lloyd and Victor J. Miller for the Republican nomination.

Results

References

Missouri
1924
Gubernatorial
November 1924 events